Danilovskaya is a rural locality (a village) in Nizhneslobodskoye Rural Settlement, Vozhegodsky District, Vologda Oblast, Russia. The population was 56 as of 2002.

Geography 
Danilovskaya is located 53 km east of Vozhega (the district's administrative centre) by road. Blinovskaya is the nearest rural locality.

References 

Rural localities in Vozhegodsky District